Party (literally means "the solo choir/chorus") was a literary magazine created and edited by Han Han. Since its launch on July 6, 2010, the first issue has sold at least 1.5 million copies and at one point, reached the top position on Amazon China. The original name of the magazine was Renaissance, which was replaced by Party due to the censorship.

History
 May 01, 2009 – Han Han wrote an article on his blog to announce the creation of a new magazine, requesting for articles.
 July 06, 2010 – Party (first issue) was officially launched.
 July 28, 2010 – The millionth copy of the first issue entered circulation.
 December 27, 2010 – The magazine ended circulation.

Editors
Han Han – Founder and Editor
Ma Yimu – Executive Editor

Notable contributors
Kevin Tsai
Ai Weiwei
Pang Ho-cheung

References

External links
Party’s microblog in Sina.com 
 Party’s group in Douban

2010 establishments in China
Bi-monthly magazines
Literary magazines published in China
Magazines established in 2010